This is a list of all Nav Canada certified and registered water and land airports, aerodromes and heliports in the provinces and territories of Canada sorted by location identifier.

They are listed in the format:
 Location indicator – IATA – Airport name (alternate name) – Airport location

CW – Canada - CAN

– Canada - CAN

References

W